Corey Smith may refer to:

Corey Smith (American football) (1979–2009), American football defensive end
Corey Smith (artist) (born 1977), American artist and snowboarder
Corey Smith (musician) (born 1979), American country/rock/blues singer and guitarist
Christopher Corey Smith, American voice actor